Clare Lawton (born 2 December 1993) is an Australian rules footballer who played for the Greater Western Sydney Giants in the AFL Women's competition. Lawton was drafted by Greater Western Sydney with their eleventh selection and ninety-seventh overall in the 2016 AFL Women's draft. She played every match in her debut season to finish with seven games. She was delisted at the end of the 2017 season. In 2018, Lawton played with Wilston Grange in the QWAFL.

References

External links 

1993 births
Living people
Greater Western Sydney Giants (AFLW) players